USS Detroit (LCS-7) is the fourth  littoral combat ship of the United States Navy. She is the sixth ship to be named after the city of Detroit, Michigan.

Design 
In 2002, the U.S. Navy initiated a program to develop the first of a fleet of littoral combat ships. The Navy initially ordered two monohull ships from Lockheed Martin, which became known as the Freedom-class littoral combat ships after the first ship of the class, . Odd-numbered U.S. Navy littoral combat ships are built using the Freedom-class monohull design, while even-numbered ships are based on a competing design, the trimaran hull  from General Dynamics. The initial order of littoral combat ships involved a total of four ships, including two of the Freedom-class design.  Detroit is the fourth Freedom-class littoral combat ship to be built.

Detroit includes additional stability improvements over the original Freedom design; the stern transom was lengthened and buoyancy tanks were added to the stern to increase weight service and enhance stability. The ship will also feature automated sensors to allow "conditions-based maintenance" and reduce crew overwork and fatigue issues that Freedom had on her first deployment.

Construction and career

The ceremonial “laying of the keel” was in early November 2012 at the Marinette Marine shipyards in Marinette, Wisconsin. The ship was launched on 18 October 2014. The US Navy accepted Detroit into service on 12 August 2016; the ship was commissioned on 22 October 2016. She is assigned to Littoral Combat Ship Squadron Two. The ship is sponsored by Mrs. Barbara Levin (Wife of Senator Carl Levin)

On 30 December 2016, Detroit participated in a homeport shift ceremony that took place at Naval Station Mayport. The ship was previously scheduled to be based out of Naval Base San Diego but was reassigned while enroute. 

On 13 January 2017, Detroit completed her first flight deck evolutions  to certify the flight deck for future air operations. The landings and VERTREP were conducted by the "World Famous Swamp Foxes" of HSM-74. On 8 March 2017, Detroit fired a vertical-launched AGM-114 Hellfire missile, the first such launch from a littoral combat ship. The Hellfire system is meant to engage small vessels and strike targets on land.

In January 2020, Detroit conducted freedom of navigation and intelligence-gathering operations in the Caribbean Sea.

However, in the final 2022 budget, Congress blocked the Navy's request to retire the three ships.

References

External links

 

Freedom-class littoral combat ships
Lockheed Martin
2014 ships
Ships built by Marinette Marine